Rezina is a city in Moldova and the capital of Rezina District. Three villages are administered by the city: Boşerniţa, Ciorna and Stohnaia.

Geography
In the northeastern part of Moldova, as far as 98 km from Chișinău, the town of Rezina is situated on three successive terraces formed by the picturesque right bank of the Dniester. The lowest terrace (along the Dniester) houses the older town, the second one (on the hill slope) contains buildings constructed in the 1950-60s, while the upper terrace is the seat of the new town constructed in the 1970-90s. The town is 3 km from the Rîbnița railway station and 6 km from that of Mateuţi. The republican highway Orhei – Rîbnița is going through the town.

History
Archaeological monuments prove the fact that first settlements appeared in the area 40-10 millennia ago. The Indo-European period (5000–3000 BC) witnessed the settlement of the Thracians (Geto-Dacians in particular) here. In 1946–1947, on Rezina's western outskirts (near the road to Echimăuţi) scientists discovered an ancient site founded by the Geto-Dacians in the 4–3rd centuries BC. It was built on a small promontory at the merger of two depressions and was 50 m long and 100 m wide. Regrettably, the site was heavily damaged by construction works on a cattle-breeding farm and a repair station for agricultural machines. The area needs further excavations in order to establish the period and causes of population destruction.

Its seal was approved on 10 September 1936.

The formation of the Roman province of Dacia had a special impact upon the lives of our ancestors. The lands of the future Rezina were not included in the Roman province and were inhabited by free Dacians. However, the close vicinity of the Romans influenced the local Geto-Dacians who, on a line with Roman provinces' inhabitants, were Romanized by having apprehended many traits of the Roman material culture and traditions, the Latin language and script, and were converted to Christianity. Since the evacuation of the Romans in 271 AD and until the 14th century, the land was swept by all kind of migrating peoples. However, the local population withstood all the adversities of the migration period and retained its Roman character. Small rural settlements numbered about 10–15 or more dwe-Uings usually inhabited by 45–50 persons tied by family relations. The favourable natural conditions of the area created all the prerequisites of normal life. Fertile soils were conducive to the development of agriculture and cattlebreeding. Dniester waters and dense forests were the two other factors favouring the establishment of the future Rezina in the late 14 – early 15th centuries.

Among Sfatul Țării members there were some Rezina locals: Vasile Bârcă and Pavel Cocârlă from Ignăţei, Elefterie Sinicliu from Echimăuţi, Nicolae Checerul Cuş from Stohnaia. In 1920, there were 749 houses and 4,320 inhabitants in Rezina. Economic units and public facilities included: 1 landowners estate, 1 agricultural cooperation, 3 quarries, a beer brewery, a tannery, 3 water- and 1 steam-mills, a primary school, a lyceum, a vocational school, some Jewish synagogues, 10 taverns, a cinema, 2 banks, a drug-store and a hospital with 3 doctors.

Media 
Cuvântul
 Vocea Basarabiei 101.9

Notable people
 Nicolae Checerul Cus

References

External links 

 An Outline of History
 web site of Rezina

Cities and towns in Moldova
Dacian towns
Orgeyevsky Uyezd
Orhei County (Romania)
Ținutul Nistru
Rezina District